Kardzhali Province  is a province of southern Bulgaria, neighbouring Greece with the Greek regional units of Xanthi, Rhodope, and Evros to the south and east. It is 3209.1 km2 in area. Its main city is Kardzhali.

History
The territory of Kardzhali province was acquired by Bulgaria during the First Balkan War in 1912. In 1913 the region was organized as the district (окръг, okrăg in Bulgarian) of Mestanli. This district was part of Stara Zagora province from 1934 until 1949, then it was transferred to the newly formed Haskovo district. In 1959 Kardzhali became the center of a new district with similar borders to the current province. Between 1987 and 1999, the region was part of Haskovo Province, after which it was restored, now as a province and with slightly changed borders.

Municipalities

The Kardzhali province (област, oblast) contains seven municipalities (singular: община, obština; plural: общини, obštini). The following table shows the names of each municipality in English and Cyrillic, the main town (in bold) or village, and the population as of 2009.

Towns and villages

The population data and figures are of December 15, 2004
 Abramovo (pop: 94)
 Ahrisko (pop: 127, elev: 680 m, postal code: 6761)

Demographics
Kardzhali is one of the three Bulgarian provinces where less than fifty percent of the population living in urban areas:  only 41% lives in urban areas in 2016. 

The following table represents the change of the population in the province after World War II:

Ethnic groups

Total population (2011 census): 152,808
Ethnic groups (2011 census):
Identified themselves: 130,781 persons:
Turks: 86,527 (66.16%)
Bulgarians: 39,519 (30.22%)
Others and indefinable: 4,735 (3.62%)

A further 22,000 persons in the province did not declare their ethnic group at the 2011 census.

In the 2001 census, 158,704 people of the population of 164,019 of Karzhali Province identified themselves as belonging to one of the following ethnic groups (with percentage of total population):

Language
In the 2001 census, 160,167 people of the population of 164,019 of Kardzhali Province identified one of the following as their mother tongue (with percentage of total population):
 101,548 Turkish
 57,046 Bulgarian
 1,171 Romani
 402 other.

Religion

According to the 2011 census, Muslims are 82,227 (70.14% of those who answered) and the Orthodox are 23,916 (20.4% of those who answered). The Muslims' figure is made up of Turks and in significant part by Muslim Bulgarians, though the Orthodox are the majority among the Bulgarians in the province.

In the 2001 census, 149,839 people of the population of 164,019 of Karzhali Province identified one of the following as their religion (with percentage of total population):

See also
Provinces of Bulgaria
Municipalities of Bulgaria
List of cities and towns in Bulgaria
List of villages in Kardzhali Province

References

 
1999 establishments in Bulgaria
States and territories established in 1999
Provinces of Bulgaria
Turkish communities outside Turkey